Tormod Skagestad (9 August 1920 – 4 January 1997) was a Norwegian poet, novelist, playwright, actor and theatre director.

Biography
Tormod Skagestad was born in Krødsherad, Buskerud county, Norway. Skagestad grew up in a rich cultural environment. His father was a teacher and sexton of the village, his mother was the organist. After his final exams (1942) and he earned a master's degree in drama  at the University of Wisconsin (1946–48).

After a period at Radioteatret (1949–1953), Skagestad worked as an instructor at Det Norske Teatret (1953–1961), served as theatre director from 1961 to 1975, and again from 1976 to 1979. He was chairman of the Norwegian Association of Theatre Manager (Norsk Teaterlederforening) for several periods and president of the Association of Norwegian Theatres (De Norske Teatres forening).

He was married to painter and artist Karin Skagestad. He was the father of actors Tove Skagestad and Bjørn Skagestad.

Awards
Critics Theatre Prize  (Teaterkritikerprisen) for the dramatization of Olav Duun's novel Ettermæle in 1976
Honorary member of the Norwegian Theatre Leader Association (Norsk Teaterlederforening)
Knight, First Order of the Royal Norwegian Order of St. Olav in 1975.

Selected works

Poems
Om fjellprofilan låg ei gullrand spent, 1946
I natt skal mange våke, 1947
Mørkt vatn glir mot havet, 1950
Havdøgn, 1950

Plays
Under treet ligg øksa, 1955
Byen ved havet, 1962
I gryet blir månen grå, 1966
Det stig av hav, 1972
Nora Helmer, 1982

Novel
Hild Rogne, 1982
På Rogne, 1983
Farvel til Rogne, 1987

References

1920 births
1997 deaths
People from Buskerud
People from Krødsherad
 University of Wisconsin–Madison College of Letters and Science alumni
Norwegian expatriates in the United States
20th-century Norwegian poets
Norwegian male poets
Norwegian theatre directors
20th-century Norwegian novelists
20th-century Norwegian dramatists and playwrights
Norwegian male novelists
Norwegian male dramatists and playwrights
20th-century Norwegian male writers